

Lac de Sauvabelin (literally "Lake of Sauvabelin") is an artificial lake in the Sauvabelin forest, above Lausanne, Switzerland.

The city of Lausanne authorized the construction of the lake in 1888. A few years later, Funiculaire Lausanne-Signal was built.

See also 
 Sauvabelin Tower
 List of lakes in Switzerland

External links 

   
 Romandie-pêche: Lac de Sauvabelin 

Sauvabelin
Lausanne
Sauvabelin
Tourist attractions in Lausanne